Mickey Petralia is an American producer, engineer, and mixer. Petralia produced all of the music on Flight of the Conchords.

Discography
2014 - Muppets Most Wanted: Original Soundtrack
2011 - The Muppets: Original Soundtrack
2009 - "The Last Day on Earth" - Kate Miller-Heidke
2009 - I Told You I Was Freaky - Flight of the Conchords
2008 - Curiouser - Kate Miller-Heidke
2007 - The Rise and Fall of Love and Hate - Oslo
2007 - The Distant Future - Flight of the Conchords
2006 - Impeach My Bush - Peaches
2006 - Be He Me - Annuals
2004 - Dangerous Dreams - Moving Units
2003 - The New Folk Implosion - The Folk Implosion
2002 - Reanimation - Linkin Park
2002 - Light & Magic - Ladytron
2000 - "Testify" - Rage Against the Machine
1999 - Midnite Vultures - Beck
1999 - Freelance Bubblehead - 1000 Clowns
1999 - I Oughtta Give You a Shot in the Head for Making Me Live in This Dump - Shivaree
1999 - Electric Honey - Luscious Jackson
1998 - Electro-Shock Blues - Eels
1997 - ...The Dandy Warhols Come Down - The Dandy Warhols
1995 - Don Knotts Overdrive - Safety Dance featuring Earl Ph.Dog

References

Year of birth missing (living people)
Living people
American record producers